Henry "Heinie" King Jawish (February 15, 1900 – March 14, 1941) was a professional football player who played in 1926 for the Pottsville Maroons of the National Football League. Born in Syria, he attended high school in Washington DC. Jawish later attended George Washington University and Georgetown University.

1900 births
1941 deaths
Georgetown Hoyas football players
George Washington Colonials football players
Pottsville Maroons players
Syrian emigrants to the United States